Draco Peak is a summit in Alberta, Canada.

Draco Peak was so named on account of its dragon-shaped outline, draco meaning "dragon" in Latin.

References

Two-thousanders of Alberta
Alberta's Rockies